The Indonesia National Beach Soccer Team represents Indonesia in international beach soccer competitions and is controlled by the PSSI, the governing body for football in Indonesia. In 2008, Indonesia made its first match against Timor Leste in the 2008 Raja Muda Johor Cup, Malaysia.

Tournament records

FIFA Beach Soccer World Cup

World Beach Games

AFC Beach Soccer Asian Cup
The tournament also call as FIFA Beach Soccer World Cup qualification for Asian (AFC) region.

Asian Beach Games

AFF Beach Soccer Championship

Squad

Results and fixtures

The following is a list of match results in the last 12 months, as well as any future matches that have been scheduled.

Legend

2022

2023

See also
 Indonesia national football team
 Indonesia national futsal team

References

External links
 

Asian national beach soccer teams
Beach soccer